Hashem Al-Ghaili (born August 11, 1990) is a Yemeni science communicator, director and producer. He is best known for his infographics and videos about scientific breakthroughs.

Al-Ghaili's work in science communication gained the attention of science news sources and social media users alike. His images have accrued large numbers of followers on popular social media outlets such as Facebook and Imgur with over 5 million weekly views. As of 25 November 2018, he has over 10 billion total views and over 30 million followers on his Facebook page.

His direction credits include This Week in Science Series, and several videos published online including Pale Blue Dot, The Future is Now, and In Science We Trust.

He gave a Ted talk, in which he pointed out deficiencies in the current educational system, and how it could be improved.

Awards
Al-Ghaili has received a grant and multiple awards for his dedication to research and his deep understanding of science communication.
 Impact Enterprises, Science Advisor (2015)
 Futurism Excellence in Science Media and Literature Award (2014)
 German Academic Exchange Service (DAAD) Award (2013-2015)
 Ambassador to the Republic of Yemen, Peshawar University (2012)

Filmography 
Al-Ghaili has directed, produced, and written two science-fiction films. His short film Simulation (2019) has won the Award of Excellence and Best Visual Effects from Los Angeles-based international awards competition Global Shorts.

 Simulation (2019, short film)
 Orbital (2022, upcoming)

References

External links
 Personal Flickr
 Hashem Al-Ghaili on Facebook
 Personal YouTube Channel

Living people
Yemeni scientists
Science communicators
1990 births
21st century Yemeni scientists